Porain or Purain is a village in Jagraon tehsil, Ludhiana district, Punjab, India.  the 2011 Census of India, the population was 2,331 people across 494 households.

References

  
Villages in Ludhiana district